The Myanmar Ambassador in Washington, D.C. is the official representative of the Government in Naypyidaw to the Government of the United States.

List of representatives

See also
 Myanmar–United States relations

References 

 
United States
Myanmar